Tamer Hasan Fernandes (born 7 December 1974) is an English former professional footballer who played as a goalkeeper in the Football League for Brentford and Colchester United.

Club career
Beginning his career under the name Tamer Aouf, Fernandes began his career in the youth system at Brentford and signed his first professional contract at the end of the 1992–93 season. Over the course of the following five seasons he served as backup to Kevin Dearden and made just 17 appearances before agreeing a settlement to his contract and leaving Griffin Park in January 1998. He immediately joined Third Division high-flyers Colchester United, but failed to make an appearance during what remained of a 1997–98 season that saw the club win promotion to the Second Division via the playoffs. He made a breakthrough into the first team and made 8 appearances during the second half of the 1998–99 season, but was released in May 1999 and dropped into non-League football to join Isthmian League Second Division club Hemel Hempstead Town.

International career 
Fernandes was capped by England Youth.

Personal life 
Fernandes began his career under the name Tamer Aouf, before changing his name to Tamer Fernandes prior to the beginning of the 1993–94 season.

Career statistics

References

External links 
 

1974 births
Living people
English footballers
Wealdstone F.C. players
Brentford F.C. players
Peterborough United F.C. players
Colchester United F.C. players
Hemel Hempstead Town F.C. players
English Football League players
Association football goalkeepers
Isthmian League players
Southern Football League players